The Molasses Act of 1733 was an Act of the Parliament of Great Britain (citation 6 Geo II. c. 13) that imposed a tax of six pence per gallon on imports of molasses from non-British colonies. Parliament created the act largely at the insistence of large plantation owners in the British West Indies. The Act was passed not to raise revenue but to regulate trade by making British products cheaper than those from the French West Indies. The Act greatly affected the significant colonial molasses trade.

Merchants purchased raw sugar (often in its liquid form, molasses) from plantations in the Caribbean and shipped it to New England and Europe, where it was sold to distillery companies that produced rum. Merchant capitalists used cash in New England from the sale of sugar to purchase rum, furs, and lumber, which their crews shipped to Europe. With the profits from the European sales, merchants purchased Europe's manufactured goods, including tools and weapons and on the next leg, shipped those manufactured goods, along with the American sugar and rum, to West Africa where they bartered the goods for slaves seized by local potentates. The crews then transported the slaves to the Caribbean and sold them to sugar plantation owners. The cash from the sale of slaves in Brazil, the Caribbean islands, and the American South used to buy more raw materials, restarting the cycle. The full triangle trip took a calendar year on average, according to the historian Clifford Shipton.

The first leg of the triangle was from a European port to Africa, in which ships carried supplies for sale and trade, such as copper, cloth, trinkets, slave beads, guns and ammunition.  When the ship arrived, its cargo would be sold or bartered for slaves. On the second leg, ships made the journey of the Middle Passage from Africa to the New World. Many slaves died of disease in the crowded holds of the slave ships. Once the ship reached the New World, enslaved survivors were sold in the Caribbean or the American colonies. The ships were then prepared to get them thoroughly cleaned, drained, and loaded with export goods for a return voyage, the third leg, to their home port, from the West Indies the main export cargoes were sugar, rum, and molasses; from Virginia, tobacco and hemp. The ship then returned to Europe to complete the triangle.

The Molasses Act 1733 provided:

The historian Theodore Draper described British intent on the tax as it would affect the American colonies:

A large colonial molasses trade had grown between the New England and Middle colonies and the French, Dutch, and Spanish West Indian possessions. Molasses from the British West Indies, which was used in New England for making rum, was priced much higher than its competitors and they also had no need for the large quantities of lumber, fish, and other items offered by the colonies in exchange. The British West Indies in the first part of the 18th century were the most important trading partner for Great Britain so Parliament was attentive to their requests. However, rather than acceding to the demands to prohibit the colonies from trading with the non-British islands, Parliament passed the prohibitively high tax on the colonies for the import of molasses from those islands.  Historian John C. Miller noted that the tax:

Largely opposed by colonists, the tax was rarely paid, and smuggling to avoid it was prominent. If actually collected, the tax would have effectively closed that source to New England and destroyed much of the rum industry. However, smuggling, bribery, or intimidation of customs officials effectively nullified the law. Miller wrote:

The growing corruption of local officials and disrespect for British Law caused by the act and others like it such as the Stamp Act or Townshend Acts eventually led to the American Revolution in 1776. This Act was replaced by the Sugar Act 1764.  This Act halved the tax rate but was accompanied by British intent of actually collecting the tax this time.

References

Sources

Further reading

 The text of the act
 

Act
1733 in the Thirteen Colonies
Great Britain Acts of Parliament 1733
History of sugar
Laws leading to the American Revolution